Kevin Russell Griffin (born 5 October 1953) is an English former professional footballer who played in the Football League for Bristol City, Cambridge United, and Mansfield Town.

References

1953 births
Living people
English footballers
Association football forwards
English Football League players
Bristol City F.C. players
Mansfield Town F.C. players
Cambridge United F.C. players
Bath City F.C. players